Experience Gloria Gaynor is the second album by Gloria Gaynor, released in 1975 on MGM Records. The album charted in the US Billboard at #64 in the US Pop chart, and at #32 in the US R&B chart. The album failed to chart in the UK, the single "How High The Moon" was issued in the UK and peaked at #33.

History
Side one of the album is dance-oriented, while side two is R&B/soul music oriented. Includes the hit singles; "Casanova Brown", "(If You Want It) Do It Yourself" and "How High the Moon" presented in a 19-minute suite by Tom Moulton. The soul music songs on side two of the album included a rendition of "What'll I Do", a well-received rendition of the Dionne Warwick hit "Walk On By" and an example of Gloria Gaynor's own songwriting called "I'm Still Yours".

The album was remastered and reissued with bonus tracks in 2010 by Big Break Records.

Track listing

Charts

Personnel
Gloria Gaynor – vocals
Allan Schwartzberg – drums
Bob Babbitt – bass guitar
Pat Rebillot – keyboards
Carlos Martin – congas
Jeff Miranov, Jerry Freidman, Lance Quinn – guitar
Jimmy Maelen – percussion
Alan Rubin, Pat Russo – trumpet
Wayne Andre, Dave Taylor – trombone
George Taylor, Lou Del Gatto – reeds
The Tony Posk Strings – strings
Linda November, Arlene Martell, Vivian Cherry – background vocals

Production
Meco Monardos – producer, arranger, vocal arrangements
 Tony Bongiovis – producer, recording engineer
Jay Ellis – producer
 Harold Wheeler – arranger
 Andrew Smith – arranger
Tom Moulton – mixing
Michael DeLugg – recording engineer
 Bob Halsall – recording engineer
Kim Stallings – recording engineer
Norman Seeff – photography 
Peter Corriston – design
Bill Levy – art direction

References

External links
 

1975 albums
Gloria Gaynor albums
Albums produced by Tony Bongiovi
MGM Records albums